The Sauber C29 was a Formula One racing car which was used by the BMW Sauber F1 Team in the 2010 Formula One season. It was unveiled on January 31, at Circuit Ricardo Tormo in Valencia.

The chassis was designed by Willy Rampf, Christoph Zimmermann, Pierre Waché and Seamus Mullarkey with the car being powered with a customer Ferrari engine.

With a lack of main sponsors, the C29 sported the team's colours and the drivers' names and flags during its launch and first test. In the third test session they moved the names and wrote the message "See you in Bahrain March 12–14" on the car's engine cover.

In Australia, Sauber announced plans to run their car with an F-duct system, similar to the version used on the McLaren MP4-25, in the free practice sessions.

2010 season
In the early part of the season, the car demonstrated very poor reliability and it was not until the seventh round of the year that the team scored a point with Kamui Kobayashi taking 10th in Turkey. In the second half of the year, the car gradually improved to a very respectable level and the team finished the season with 44 points, taking eighth in the Constructors' Championship.

Livery 
In comparison to previous years, the C29 featured a plain livery that consisted of white, black and red. These are the team's actual colours, but because of sponsorship by Red Bull and BMW, the team had never run this scheme before. At the start of 2010, the car had no sponsors, only the driver's name and nationality on the bodywork. As the year progressed, the team gained sponsors, including Burger King, スカルプ D Scalp D, TAKATA, Certina, BRIDESTONE, Onegai My Melody, MITSUBISHI ELECTRIC & Converse.

Complete Formula One results
(key) (results in bold indicate pole position; results in italics indicate fastest lap)

References

External links

C29